Tele Maroc or Télé Maroc is a Moroccan and Arabic free-to-air Entertainment channel in Morocco and North Africa and South Europe with an SD feed.

About Tele Maroc
A free-to-air channel, Tele Maroc broadcasts standard entertainment as well as talk shows and documentaries and sports talks programs.

See also
 Television in Morocco
 Communications in Morocco

External links
 

Arabic-language television stations
Television stations in Morocco
Television channels and stations established in 2017
Mass media in Madrid
Mass media companies of Morocco